Padang Island is an island in Riau province, Indonesia, close to the east coast of Sumatra island. The area is 1,109 km² and the population at the 2010 Census was 42,118. Administratively, it forms the district (kecamatan) of Merbau within the Meranti Islands Regency of Riau province. It should not be confused with the city of Padang, Sumatra, or the island Padang in Borneo.

Islands of Sumatra
Populated places in Indonesia